Sorour is a surname. Notable people with the surname include:

 Mohamed Sorour aka, Sorour (born 1993), Egyptian Singer, Musical Artist, and Songwriter 
 Ahmad Fathi Sorour (born 1932), Egyptian politician
 Faisal Sorour (born 1996), Kuwaiti Paralympic athlete
 Mashallah Amin Sorour (1931–2010), Iranian cyclist